People nicknamed Bear or the Bear include:

 Albert the Bear (c. 1100–1170), Margrave of Brandenburg
 James Brady (1940–2014), press secretary to U.S. President Ronald Reagan and shooting victim
 Bear Bryant (1913–1983), American college football coach
 Don Haskins (1930-2008), American college football coach
 Dainton Connell (1961–2007), Arsenal hooligan leader known as "The Bear", assistant to the Pet Shop Boys
 Edward Ellice (merchant) (1783–1863), British merchant and politician known as "The Bear"
 Bear Grylls (born 1974), British adventurer and television presenter
 Bear McCreary (born 1979), musician and composer
 Michael Taliferro (1961-2006), American film and television actor and sportsman
 Owsley Stanley (1935–2011), underground LSD cook known as "The Bear"
 Cameron White (born 1983), Australian cricketer
 Raymond Wolf (1904–1979), American football and baseball player and coach

See also
 
 
 Bear (disambiguation)
 Jack Nicklaus (born 1940), American golfer nicknamed "The Golden Bear"
 Bear (surname)

Lists of people by nickname